Elisabeth Wilma Burton Kirkby  (born 26 January 1921), alternatively Elizabeth Kirkby, is a British Australian retired politician. Kirkby entered politics serving with the Australian Democrats in the New South Wales Legislative Council as State Parliamentary Leader from 1981 to 1998, after which she served a seat on local government, as a councillor for Temora from 1999 and 2004. 
 
Prior to her political career Kirkby worked in film, television and theatre, starting from 1938 as an assistant stage manager in her native England before becoming a radio broadcaster, producer, director and screenwriter in Malaysia. She emigrated to Australia, where she became known for her small screen role as Lucy Sutcliffe in the serial Number 96.

Early life
Born in Bolton, Lancashire, (now part of Greater Manchester) north-west England to James Burton Kirkby and Frances Robinson Kirkby's performance career began in the United Kingdom during the second world war, where she spent three years working for the war effort with the woman's branch of the British Army the Auxiliary Territorial Service, and as an entertainer, writer and producer for Stars in Battledress.

Entertainment career
She appeared in telemovies in her native United Kingdom including Mr. Bolfrey and the televised play Love from a Stranger, based on a stage production written by Frank Vosper from a novel by Agatha Christie. Kirkby emigrated to Malaya, where she spent 15 years writing, producing and directing for radio and the arts. She then relocated to Sydney, Australia in 1965, where she wrote and produced documentaries and educational programs for the ABC, after Kirkby's stint at the ABC, she moved to commercial television in guest starring drama roles. These included Rip Tide, The Rovers, in Crawford Productions' espionage drama Hunter and their police drama Homicide and in the serial The Group.
 
Her next role was that of Lucy Sutcliffe in the soap opera Number 96. The character of Lucy was devised by writer David Sale, who had previously cast her in The Group. He based her and her husband Alf Sutcliffe (played by James Elliott) after his own parents from Lancashire, England, even naming the character of Lucy after his mother. "The only difference," said Sale, "was my parents from native England loved Australia, so to make it a little interesting we would have the character of Alf, as the typical whinging Pommy, who was also longing to return to the United Kingdom, despite Lucy's disapproval."

Kirkby was an original cast member of Number 96 which premiered March 1972. Unsure of how long the series would last, the producers offered the original cast contracts lasting just six weeks. The show became Australia's 10th highest-rated television program in 1972, was the number 1 highest rating program in 1973 and 1974, and the 6th highest rated program for 1975. The episode in which it was revealed that Lucy's tumour was benign proved to be Number 96'''s highest-ever rated episode. In late 1973 the show had a feature film spin-off featuring much of the show's current cast, including Kirkby, reprising their television roles. Kirby provided a commentary for the DVD release of the series alongside co-star Carol Raye and Michael Kirby
 
After Number 96 Kirkby went into a theatre run in Melbourne, appearing in The Jockey Club Stakes alongside Robert Coote and Wilfrid Hyde White in late 1975. Kirkby and White had previously met 30 years previously in the entertainment division of the army during World War II. Kirkby subsequently made guest appearances on Australian drama series such as The Outsiders and Glenview High and again appeared in Homicide before leaving the industry to enter politics,

Political career
Kirkby became a politician and was elected to the New South Wales legislative council in 1981. She was the Australian Democrats' New South Wales state leader and became the longest-serving Australian Democrat member of parliament before retiring in June 1998. She remained in politics, at a local government level, serving as a councillor in Temora Shire from 1999 to 2004. In November 2010 she sold her sheep and wheat farm in Temora, New South Wales and moved to Morning Bay on Pittwater's western foreshore, accessible only by boat.

Personal life and honours
Kirkby is divorced and has one daughter and two sons, Debbie Baile, her daughter became an actress and appeared in Number 96 in 1975. Baile also acted in The Young Doctors and the film Undercover.   
 
In 2006 Kirkby earned an Arts Degree and in 2014 a PhD from the University of Sydney at the age of 93, becoming Australia's oldest university graduate. Her thesis was on unemployment during the Great Depression, and she has become an advocate for older people to learn and study. In 2012 she was awarded the national Medal of the Order of Australia, for "service to the Parliament of New South Wales, to the community of Temora, and to the performing arts".

Filmography

Regular TV role

ThesisWill We Ever Learn From History? The Impact of Economic Orthodoxy on Unemployment during the Great Depression in Australia'' – doctorate thesis (University of Sydney)

Notes

See also
List of the first women holders of political offices in Oceania

References

External links

 

|-

1921 births
Living people
English stage actresses
Australian soap opera actresses
Members of the New South Wales Legislative Council
Australian Democrats politicians
New South Wales local councillors
English emigrants to Australia
British emigrants to Malaysia
Recipients of the Medal of the Order of Australia
University of Sydney alumni
Auxiliary Territorial Service soldiers
Australian sheep breeders
People from Bolton
Women members of the New South Wales Legislative Council
Women local councillors in Australia
Australian centenarians
English centenarians
20th-century English women
20th-century English people
Women centenarians